Mohd Saharul Ridzwan bin Hashim (born January 26, 1989) is a Malaysian actor and model. He began his entertainment career in 2013 after participating in Hero Remaja 2011/12. He since then appears in several dramas such as Hati Perempuan where he paired with Mia Ahmad and Kau, Aku, Kita with Janna Nick.

Early life
He was born on January 26, 1989, in Kuantan, Pahang, and grew up in Chabang Empat, Kelantan. He holds a degree in aircraft maintenance engineering at a college in Negeri Sembilan flights. Married to Qaabila Deena Emir Mohammed Akif Emir.

Career
Saharul made his first appearance in Hero Remaja 2012. He earned third place in the competition behind Fattah Amin, Hafidz Roshdi and Syafiq Kyle. Then he ventured into acting with a supporting role in several tele-films and drama. Casting him as Faizal in the drama Love You Mr. Arrogant (2013) managed to get the attention of the public. Following the success of psycho Syarul role in the drama, he was given the starring role in the drama Romi Love Julia (2014).

Saharul at the announcement of finalists Anugerah Bintang Popular BH 2014 (ABPBH 2014) at the Royal Chulan.
Saharul also nominated as Best Male New Artist in Anugerah Bintang Popular Artists 2014. Saharul also won the Popular Action Selfie in the Anugerah Bintang Popular Berita Harian 2015.

Saharul growing popularity when he plays in the drama Tengku Zaril Heart Women who live on TV3 Akasia slot. Hati perempuan is a drama adaptation of the novel Hati Perempuan or A woman's heart work Nur Ain Al-Abbas. A strong partnership between Syarul with new actress, Mia Ahmad managed to attract the attention of many people.

He also shine alongside teen actress, Janna Nick in drama Kau Aku Kita.

Syarul appear with drama adaptation of the novel that is as beautiful as Fate Love coupling Amyra actor Jim served around the month of Ramadan in 2016 and I We're tele Kingdom with Janna Nick, innovators and Issey Fazlisham Roshdi on Eid 2016.

He first appeared and drama film directed by Michael Ang namely #AssalamualaikumCinta alongside Kamal Adli & Ghost Mental Hospital as a ghost character with Abam Bocey & Fizz Fairuz will be screened later this year.

Filmography

Film

Television

References 

1989 births
Living people
Malaysian people of Malay descent
Malaysian Muslims
Malaysian male film actors
Malaysian male television actors
Malaysian male models